Charles Chase (18 February 1931 – 25 February 1997) was a Canadian boxer. He competed in the men's light middleweight event at the 1952 Summer Olympics.

References

1931 births
1997 deaths
Canadian male boxers
Olympic boxers of Canada
Boxers at the 1952 Summer Olympics
Boxers from Montreal
Light-middleweight boxers